Lieutenant General Kanwal Jeet Singh Dhillon, PVSM, UYSM, YSM, VSM is a retired General Officer of the Indian Army. He last served as the Director General Defence Intelligence Agency (DG DIA) and Deputy Chief of Integrated Defence Staff (Intelligence) (DCIDS Int) under the Chief of Defence Staff (CDS) from 9 March 2020 to 31 January 2022. Prior to this, he served as the 48th Commander of the XV Corps assuming the post from Lieutenant General Anil Kumar Bhatt.

Early life and education 
Dhillon is an alumnus of National Defence Academy, Khadakwasla & Indian Military Academy, Dehradun. He graduated from the Defence Services Staff College, Wellington, and the National Defence College, Delhi.

Career 
Dhillon was commissioned in December 1983 in Rajputana Rifles and has had an illustrious military career spanning 39 years is credited with important appointments at the Army Headquarters and instructional appointments at Infantry School, Mhow, and Indian Army training team abroad. He has an incisive understanding of Jammu and Kashmir, as he served there for five tenures since 1988 with notable being sector commander of Rashtriya Rifles and Brigadier General Staff of the Chinar Corps. Before taking over as the Chinar Corps Commander, the General Officer was tenanting the appointment of Director General Perspective Planning. He was appointed as the Colonel of the Regiment of Rajputana Rifles on September 21, 2019, when he took over from Lt Gen Abhay Krishna.
He retired from Service on January 31, 2022 handing over the reigns to his successor Lt Gen CP Cariappa as the Colonel of Regiment of Rajputana Rifles.

As XV Corps commander
He has successfully maintained a balance, in Kashmir's security scenario, between counter-infiltration and counter-terrorist operations on one hand and the use of military soft power on the other. The perpetrators of Pulwama Blast were targeted in the first 100 hours. In an official statement on this, he described his efforts against terror launch pads especially, "after August 5 last year", as the statement read.

Operation MAA (Mother) for Mission Kashmir
He appealed to the mothers, of local terrorists, to impress upon their sons to shun the path of violence and rejoin the mainstream for safe rehabilitation. To reduce local terrorists, continuously chances are given to misguided youth to 'return', he prefers to use the word ‘return’ and not ‘surrender’. Lauding the important role of women folk in Kashmiri society he said "Mothers, sisters & daughters are key to family life, in Kashmir households". Giving hope to them he said “You are the future family builders. May you achieve much in your personal, social & professional lives” and "Mothers are the pillar of society. Since young boys invariably listen to their mothers, I urge them to guide their children to follow the righteous path".

Operation MAA (Mother)
Mothers have been the pillar of Kashmiri society and enjoy immense respect. On many occasions he has reached out to the mothers, to make them aware that many stone-pelters become terrorists and mothers should prevent their sons from becoming neither. Even during encounters mothers have spoken to their sons convincing them to ‘return’. Results have convinced more mothers and sons to reunite happily while their identities remain safe. Fifty youths have abandoned terrorism and the laudatory messages from mothers are priceless ‘gifts’ to him.

Awam Aur Army—"Humsaya Hain Hum". (Public and Army – "We are Co-Inhabitants")
He has defined the relation between the common man in Kashmir and the Army as that of a 'Humsaya' or co-inhabitants; and has always stood for a people-friendly environment. He has extensively used social, print and electronic media for assuring the public of their security and safety. To avoid any losses of innocent lives during ‘encounters’ he requested the locals to avoid un-cleared areas. He has interacted with the Shri Amarnatji Yatrees, those proceeding on Hajj, participated in Eid Milan and annual Kheer Bhawani fair emphasising the essence and importance of Kashmiriyat, the syncretic culture of Kashmir.

Kashmir Youth - Positively Hopeful
During his over 12-year tenure, he has found the Kashmiri youth to be very energetic, highly cultured and very positive. He called upon the youth to increase connect with the Army for professional and personal growth, and to take up the many employment opportunities in the Army.  The message to the youth has been to stay motivated, take education seriously, stay away from drugs, respect parents and become a good citizen and son.

"Taleem Se Taraqqi (Development through Education) Campaign
Elucidating the role of education in the development of Kashmiri youth, he has highlighted the role of Army Goodwill Schools (AGS) in providing quality education at very affordable cost, and the endeavour to modernise by digitisation of sixteen AGS through Corporate Social Responsibility(CSR) efforts of Power Grid Corporation of India Limited(PGCIL). There is even outreach to the children of Gujars, Bakarwals and those grazing cattle in remote areas. Lauding the role of teachers he said "Mitti to mitti hoti hai, lekin jab kumhar ka hath lagta hai to wahi mitti ek bhagwan ki murti ban jati hai". He, on numerous occasions, has urged the youth to benefit from the very popular and successful Super 50 (Engineering) with CSR support from Petronet LNG and Super 30 (Medical) with CSR support from Hindustan Petroleum Corporation Limited (HPCL).

Awards and decorations 
During his military career of 39 years, he has been awarded with the Param Vishisht Seva Medal, Uttam Yudh Seva Medal, Yudh Seva Medal, and the Vishisht Seva Medal.

Books
 Kitne Ghazi Aaye, Kitne Ghazi Gaye, My Life Story

References 

Indian Army officers
Indian generals
Living people
Year of birth missing (living people)
National Defence College, India alumni
Recipients of the Param Vishisht Seva Medal
Recipients of the Uttam Yudh Seva Medal
Recipients of the Yudh Seva Medal
Recipients of the Vishisht Seva Medal
Defence Services Staff College alumni